Irwin Hendrick Dregne (2 January 1917–18 September 1967) was a colonel in the United States Air Force and commanded the 357th Fighter Group during World War II from 2 December 1944 – 21 July 1945.

World War II
 
Dregne succeeded Lt. Col. John D. Landers as commander of the 357th Fighter Group in December 1944 and served in that capacity through July 1945. Landers took command of the 78th Fighter Group at RAF Duxford in February 1945.

Korean War
Dregne commanded the 51st Fighter Interceptor Group during the Korean War.

Awards and decorations
Dregne was an ace and was credited with shooting down 5 enemy aircraft. He received the Distinguished Service Cross for heroism during a bomber escort mission to Derben, Germany on 14 January 1945.

References

1917 births
1967 deaths
United States Army Air Forces pilots of World War II
American Korean War pilots